Eric Peterman (born November 18, 1986) is a former American football wide receiver. He was signed by the Chicago Bears as an undrafted free agent in 2009. He attended Sacred Heart-Griffin High school in Springfield, Illinois and excelled at the quarterback position. He played college football at Northwestern as a wide receiver.

College career
In 2008, he was named the winner of the ARA Sportsmanship Award, presented by the Awards and Recognition Association to the Division I football player who best exhibits sportsmanship both on and off the field.

Professional career

Chicago Bears
Peterman was signed by the Chicago Bears as an undrafted free agent in 2009. He was cut by the Bears on September 5 and was re-signed to the practice squad on December 30. He was re-signed to a one-year contract on February 22, 2010. He was waived/injured on August 23.

AArete
Peterman was employed as a Manager at AArete, a Chicago-based management consulting firm focused on the healthcare industry before starting his own company.

GRNE Solar
As of December 2018, Eric Peterman is the CEO and founder of GRNE Solar. Founded in 2012, GRNE Solar has proven to be a staple in the Illinois solar market due to the company’s ability to tackle projects that vary from residential rooftops to megawatt scale solar fields.

References

Living people
1986 births
American football wide receivers
Northwestern Wildcats football players
Chicago Bears players